The Tanzania Teachers’ Union (TTU) is a teachers' trade union in Tanzania.

History 
The union was formed in 1993 with the intent of advocating and promoting the rights of teachers in Tanzania.

In 2006, the union's president Margaret Simwanza Sitta was appointed as Minister of Education and Vocational Training by President Jakaya Kikwete.

The union had observer status at the 17th Ordinary African Union Summit in 2011.

In 2012, 200,000 teachers went on strike after 95.7 percent of Union members voted in favour. Union chairman Gratian Mukoba said that a pay rise was necessary.

In May 2017, the union condemned the sacking of 10,000 civil servants.

Leadership 
Leah Ulaya is the current union president. Christopher Banda is the Vice President.

Ezekiah Oluoch was the deputy secretary general.

References

External links 

 Official website
Webpage at the Commonwealth of Nations

Further reading 

 Trade unions participation on improving employee Condition: a case of Tanzania teachers union

See also 

 Trade unions in Tanzania

1993 establishments in Tanzania
Trade unions in Tanzania
Education trade unions
Dodoma
Education in Tanzania